Győző Török (22 May 1935 – 11 April 1987) was a Hungarian cyclist. Török was born in Budapest, and as officially being an employee of the Hungarian Railways, he started racing for their cycling team. He competed in the road race at the 1960 Summer Olympics, but failed to finish. He won the Tour de Hongrie in 1955 and 1956. He died by suicide on 11 April 1987.

References 

1935 births
1987 deaths
Cyclists at the 1960 Summer Olympics
Olympic cyclists of Hungary
Hungarian male cyclists
Sportspeople from Miskolc
1987 suicides
Suicides in Hungary